Universitetsforlaget AS (English: "The University Press"), also known in English as Scandinavian University Press, is a Norwegian academic publishing company, which publishes non-fiction literature and journals mainly oriented to Scandinavia. Universitetsforlaget is the largest academic press in Scandinavia, and is a wholly owned independently operated subsidiary of Aschehoug, founded in 1872. Universitetsforlaget was originally the name of an independent publishing company founded by Tønnes Andenæs in 1950, that later merged with other publishing companies to become a subsidiary of Aschehoug in 2000.

History

The publishing house in its current form was established in 2000, and has two different origins: One is Universitetsforlaget, founded by Tønnes Andenæs in 1950. The second origin is the publishing house Tanum-Norli, which is itself the result of the merger of two publishing companies founded in 1890 and 1933, respectively. In 1982 Aschehoug acquired Tanum-Norli, which was renamed Tano. In 2000, Tano and Universitetsforlaget merged under the name Universitetsforlaget. The international journals were sold to Taylor & Francis in the 2000s. Today, the publisher is a wholly owned subsidiary of Aschehoug and publishes books and academic journals in the Scandinavian languages.

Universitetsforlaget has around 50 employees. The publishing house publishes around 80 academic journals and 140 books every year.

CEOs of Universitetsforlaget:
2000–2002: Laila Stange
2002–2005: Arne Magnus
2005–2014 : Svein Skarheim
2014– : Hege Gundersen

Awards

Article of the Year – The Scandinavian University Press Academic Journal Prize
The Article of the Year – The Scandinavian University Press Academic Journal Prize is a Nordic academic prize awarded by Universitetsforlaget to "recognise the best scholarship that is published in the Nordic countries." A Nordic jury selects the recipient(s) on the basis of nominations from 42 academic journals. Each journal nominates the best article that was published in the journal in the past year.

The recipients are:

2004: Trude Haugli
2005: Tord Larsen
2006: Erling E. Guldbrandsen
2007: 
2008: Jens Chr. Andvig	
2009: Tor A. Benjaminsen	
2010: Audun Dybdahl	
2011: Marianne Nordli Hansen	
2012: Jon Haarberg	
2013: 
2014: Siemke Böhnisch	
2015: Terje Tvedt	
2016: ,  and Elin Borg	
2017: 
2018: 
2019: Nora Simonhjell and 	
2020: Hendrik Storstein Spilker and Magnus Kongshaug Johannessen
2021: Margunn Bjørnholt

See also 
 Journals published by Universitetsforlaget
 Open access in Norway

Further reading 
 Egeland, Marianne: Med kunnskap skal landet bygges : Universitetsforlaget 1950–1990, 1996

References

External links 
  
 Article at snl.no 
 Article at caplex.no 

Publishing companies of Norway
Academic publishing companies
Publishing companies established in 2000
2000 establishments in Norway
Companies based in Oslo